Latin soul (sometimes used synonymously with Boogaloo) was a short-lived musical genre that had developed in the 1960s in New York City. It had consisted of a blend of Cuban mambo with elements of Latin jazz and soul music. Although short-lived, the genre had a very great influence on the growing Salsa movement which would dominate the New York Latin music scene in the 1970s. Today, the term is typically used by Hispanic and Latino artists producing R&B and/or soul music.

Latin soul heavily emphasized its Afro-Cuban rhythms and featured songs sung mainly in English. The style grew out of an attempt on the part of Latin musicians in New York City to expand the reach of their music beyond the local Latin community and into the broader mainstream American society.

See also 
 Brown-eyed soul

References

External links 

 NYT article on Casa Ameado, where many Latin soul artists collaborated

Hispanic American music
Soul music genres
Latin music genres